Copper(II) telluride is an inorganic compound with the chemical formula CuTe that occurs in nature as a rare mineral vulcanite.

References

Copper(II) compounds
Tellurides